To Be Without Worries (German: Einmal keine Sorgen haben) is a 1953 Austrian-German historical comedy film directed by Georg Marischka and starring Walter Müller, Hans Moser and Walter Koch. It was shot at the Schönbrunn Studios in Vienna. The film's sets were designed by the art directors Fritz Jüptner-Jonstorff and Alexander Sawczynski.

Cast
 Walter Müller as Weinberl  
 Hans Moser as Melchior  
 Walter Koch as Christopherl  
 Nadja Tiller as Frau von Fischer  
 Wera Frydtberg as Marie  
 Paula Pfluger as Madame Knorr  
 Alma Seidler as Frau Blumenblatt  
 Fritz Imhoff as Herr Zangler  
 Ernst Stankovski as Herr Sanders  
 Helmut Qualtinger as Kraps  
 Hugo Gottschlich as Rab  
 Heinz Conrads 
 Hertha Martin as Philippine  
 Ady Berber as Wachmann Nestroy  
 Ena Valduga 
 Martin Costa
 Fritz Muliar 
 Erich Dörner 
 Elvira Weigel as Lisette  
 Michael Kehlmann

References

Bibliography 
 Fritsche, Maria. Homemade Men in Postwar Austrian Cinema: Nationhood, Genre and Masculinity. Berghahn Books, 2013.

External links 
 

1953 films
1950s historical comedy films
Austrian historical comedy films
German historical comedy films
West German films
1950s German-language films
Films directed by Georg Marischka
Films scored by Oscar Straus
Films set in the 1840s
German films based on plays
1953 comedy films
Austrian black-and-white films
German black-and-white films
1950s German films
Films shot at Schönbrunn Studios